Pump is a 2014 documentary film by Josh Tickell and Rebecca Harrell Tickell.  The film begins by exploring the history of petroleum-based fuel consumption, the use of the Internal combustion engine and the geopolitics involved with petroleum. It is primarily focuses on the United States but also includes a segment on the automotive industry in China. The film then explores in-depth on the alternative energy options for vehicles that are either readily available for use or can be on a mass scale. This includes ethanol fuel, methanol fuel, Flexible-fuel vehicles in Brazil, flexible-fuel vehicles in the United States, and electric vehicles including Tesla Motors.

Funding for the film came from Patrón tequila founder John Paul DeJoria, Rhino Films executive Stephen Nemeth and the Fuel Freedom Foundation.

References

External links
 

2014 films
Documentary films about petroleum
Documentary films about alternative energy
2014 documentary films
2010s English-language films